Pterolophia fasciata is a species of beetle in the family Cerambycidae. It was described by Bernhard Schwarzer in 1925.

References

fasciata
Beetles described in 1925